In enzymology, an ascopyrone tautomerase is an enzyme that catalyzes the chemical reaction

1,5-anhydro-4-deoxy-D-glycero-hex-3-en-2-ulose  1,5-anhydro-4-deoxy-D-glycero-hex-1-en-3-ulose

Hence, this enzyme has one substrate, 1,5-anhydro-4-deoxy-D-glycero-hex-3-en-2-ulose, and one product, 1,5-anhydro-4-deoxy-D-glycero-hex-1-en-3-ulose.

The enzyme is involved with the anhydrofructose pathway.

This enzyme belongs to the family of isomerases, specifically those intramolecular oxidoreductases interconverting keto- and enol-groups.  The systematic name of this enzyme class is 1,5-anhydro-4-deoxy-D-glycero-hex-3-en-2-ulose Delta3-Delta1-isomerase. Other names in common use include ascopyrone isomerase, ascopyrone intramolecular oxidoreductase, 1,5-anhydro-D-glycero-hex-3-en-2-ulose tautomerase, APM tautomerase, ascopyrone P tautomerase, and APTM.

See also 
 Anhydrofructose pathway
 1,5-anhydro-D-fructose dehydratase
 exo-(1→4)-α-D-glucan lyase

References

 
 

EC 5.3.2
Enzymes of unknown structure